Sukawati is a district in Gianyar Regency, Bali, Indonesia. As of the 2010 census, the area was 55.02 km2 and the population was 110,429; the latest official estimate (as at mid 2019) is 125,470.

Villages in the district of Sukawati include the villages (urban Kelurahan and rural Desa) of Batuan, Batuan Kaler, Batubulan, Batubulan Kangin, Celuk, Guwang, Kemenuh, Ketewel, Singapadu, Singapadu Kaler, Singapadu Tengah and Sukawati.

References

Districts of Bali
Gianyar Regency
Populated places in Bali